Hosea Walter "Buster" Allen (October 23, 1918 – September 26, 1948), also listed as Hoses Allen, was an American baseball pitcher in the Negro leagues. He played with the Jacksonville Red Caps, Cleveland Buckeyes, and the Indianapolis–Cincinnati Clowns from 1941 to 1947.

References

External links
 and Baseball-Reference Black Baseball Stats and  Seamheads

Indianapolis Clowns players
Cleveland Buckeyes players
Jacksonville Red Caps players
1918 births
1948 deaths
Baseball players from Jacksonville, Florida
Baseball pitchers
20th-century African-American sportspeople